The 2014 South American U-20 Women's Championship was the 6th edition of the South American under-20 women's football championship. It was held from 12 to 31 January 2014 in Uruguay. The best two teams also qualified for the 2014 FIFA U-20 Women's World Cup.

Brazil were the defending champions having won all five previous editions of the tournament.

After two of three matchdays in the final round Brazil and Paraguay already qualified to the World Cup, Brazil for the sixth time and Paraguay for the first time.

Participating teams
All ten nations of CONMEBOL participated.

 (holders)

 (hosts)

First stage
The draw was held on 16 November 2013.

If teams finish level on points, order will be determined according to the following criteria:
 superior goal difference in all matches
 greater number of goals scored in all group matches
 better result in matches between tied teams
 drawing of lots

All match times are in local Uruguay Summer Time (UTC−02:00).

Group A

Group B

Second stage
The four teams will play a single round-robin. Each teams thus plays three matches in this final stage. The winner and the runner-up teams qualify for the 2014 FIFA U-20 Women's World Cup in Canada.

References

External links
Tournament at CONMEBOL.com
Schedule  at CONMEBOL.com
Tournament at futbol24.com

South American U-20 Women's Championship
2014 in women's association football
International association football competitions hosted by Uruguay
2014 in South American football
2013–14 in Uruguayan football
2014 in youth association football
Foo